The Matre Power Station  is a hydroelectric power station located in Masfjorden, Vestland, Norway.

See also

References 

Buildings and structures in Vestland
Hydroelectric power stations in Norway
Masfjorden